Wherever We May Roam (mentioned by band members in interviews as Wherever I May Roam) was a concert tour by the American heavy metal band Metallica in support of their eponymous fifth studio album (commonly known as The Black Album). It began in autumn of 1991. The North American legs ran through summer 1992, followed by the Guns N' Roses/Metallica Stadium Tour, the Wherever We May Roam European leg, and finally the Nowhere Else to Roam tour of smaller markets in North America, Mexico, Asia, Australia, South America, Europe and Israel, ending in the summer of 1993.

These initial North American shows took place in arenas, with multiple dates in largely populated areas not uncommon. The band was at a commercial peak, following the release of their fifth album as well as their highly successful and best-selling album called Metallica (The Black Album) and its breakthrough hit "Enter Sandman". The leg of the tour overlapped with the Freddie Mercury Tribute Concert, at which Metallica performed a short set.

The 1991 European leg was part of the Monsters of Rock festival. The last concert of that leg, held on September 28, 1991, at Tushino Airfield in Moscow, was described as "the first free outdoor Western rock concert in Soviet history" and had a crowd estimated between 150,000 and 500,000 people, with some unofficial estimates as high as 1,600,000. On the North American leg, the January 13 and 14, 1992, shows in San Diego were later released in the box set Live Shit: Binge & Purge, while the tour and the album were later documented in A Year and a Half in the Life of Metallica.

During the Guns N' Roses/Metallica Stadium Tour, Hetfield suffered second and third degree burns to his arms, face, hands, and legs during a live performance of the introduction of "Fade to Black".

First typical setlist
(Taken from the Cincinnati, Ohio, Riverfront Coliseum show on March 2, 1992)

 "Enter Sandman"
 "Creeping Death"
 "Harvester of Sorrow"
 "Welcome Home (Sanitarium)"
 "Sad but True"
 "Wherever I May Roam"
 Bass Solo
 "Through the Never"
 "The Unforgiven"
 "Justice Medley"
 "Eye of the Beholder"
 "Blackened"
 "The Frayed Ends of Sanity"
 "...And Justice for All"
 "Blackened"
 Drum solo
 Guitar solo
 "Nothing Else Matters"
 "For Whom the Bell Tolls"
 "Fade to Black"
 "Whiplash"
 "Master of Puppets"
 "Seek & Destroy"
 "One"
 "Last Caress" (originally performed by the Misfits)
 "Am I Evil?" (originally performed by Diamond Head)
 "Battery"
 "Stone Cold Crazy" (originally performed by Queen)

Second typical setlist
(Taken from the Rome, Italy, Palamarino show on November 16, 1992)

 "Enter Sandman"
 "Creeping Death"
 "Harvester of Sorrow"
 "Welcome Home (Sanitarium)"
 "Sad but True"
 "Wherever I May Roam"
 "The Unforgiven"
 "Justice Medley"
 "Eye of the Beholder"
 "Blackened"
 "The Frayed Ends of Sanity"
 "...And Justice for All"
 "Blackened"
 Bass Solo
 Guitar Solo
 "Through the Never"
 "For Whom the Bell Tolls
 "Fade to Black"
 "Master of Puppets"
 "Seek & Destroy"
 "Whiplash"
 "Nothing Else Matters"
 "Am I Evil?" (originally performed by Diamond Head)
 "Last Caress" (originally performed by the Misfits)
 "One"
 "Battery"
 "Stone Cold Crazy" (originally performed by Queen)

The show
The band dispensed with supporting acts on the tour, billing it on tickets as "An Evening with Metallica / No Opening Act". Instead, a video presentation was shown before the concerts actually started which lasted about 20 or 25 minutes. Included might be clips of local sights near the venue, Metallica shopping in local stores, roadies prepping the arena, Lars Ulrich walking around backstage giving introductions and reciting band history, or other band members engaging in various hijinks. The video would conclude with a montage of "Enter Sandman" with film clips of Clint Eastwood in The Good, the Bad and the Ugly.

Setlists consisted of a mixture of Metallica (The Black Album) material with fan-favorite songs from their first four albums. Shows were typically three hours long.

The stage itself was a diamond form, with a number of singing and playing positions that would allow band members to rotate around. Two drum kits were typically setup on opposite sides of the stage, with the ability to lower the kits down below the stage or raise it to the stage itself, as well as move the kits around to different positions on the stage. Some selected fans were located in a pit inside the stage area dubbed the "Snakepit" by the band.

At different points in the show, individual solo slots were offered up, typically a bass solo, a guitar solo, then later a drum solo. The drum slot was often the most popular, with James Hetfield often taking a seat behind the second kit, dueling with Ulrich. Drum parts from other bands such as Slayer might be quoted, or Kirk Hammett might appear to play a bit of "Smoke on the Water" along with the drums. The bass solos often included segments with the guitars.

Tour dates

Personnel
 James Hetfield – lead vocals, rhythm guitar
 Kirk Hammett – lead guitar, backing vocals
 Lars Ulrich – drums
 Jason Newsted – bass, backing vocals

References

Metallica concert tours
1991 concert tours
1992 concert tours